This is a list of First Nations governments (also band governments) in the Canadian province of British Columbia.  "First Nation" refers to the Aboriginal peoples in Canada who are neither Inuit nor Métis.  In the context used here, it refers only to band governments.  For a list of peoples and ethnicities please see List of First Nations peoples in British Columbia (which includes extinct groups).  For a list of Indian Reserves, see List of Indian reserves in British Columbia.

See also
List of tribal councils in British Columbia
Status of British Columbian First Nation Treaties

 
First Nations
First Nations in British Columbia